Flaca may refer to:

 Flaçà, a town in Spain
Marisol Gonzales, a character in Orange is the New Black, nicknamed "Flaca"

See also
 La Flaca (disambiguation)